Li Lu (born 18 February 1992 in Panzhihua, Sichuan) is a Chinese slalom canoeist who competed at the international level from 2009 to 2016.

She finished in 13th place in the K1 event at the 2016 Summer Olympics in Rio de Janeiro.

World Cup individual podiums

References

External links
 
 
 Lu LI at CanoeSlalom.net

1992 births
Living people
People from Panzhihua
Sportspeople from Sichuan
Chinese female canoeists
Olympic canoeists of China
Canoeists at the 2016 Summer Olympics
Canoeists at the 2014 Asian Games
Asian Games competitors for China